Guy Serge Cédric Yaméogo (born 30 December 2000) is an Ivorian professional footballer who plays as a centre-back for TFF First League club Boluspor, on loan from Samsunspor.

Career 
On 19 August 2020, Yaméogo signed for Turkish club Samsunspor on a five-year contract. On 22 July 2022, he moved to Boluspor on loan for the 2022–23 season.

Honours 
Westerlo

 Belgian First Division B: 2021–22

References 

2000 births
Living people
Ivorian footballers
Association football central defenders
Williamsville Athletic Club players
NK Tabor Sežana players
Samsunspor footballers
K.V.C. Westerlo players
Boluspor footballers
Ligue 1 (Ivory Coast) players
Slovenian PrvaLiga players
TFF First League players
Challenger Pro League players
Ivorian expatriate footballers
Expatriate footballers in Slovenia
Ivorian expatriate sportspeople in Slovenia
Expatriate footballers in Turkey
Ivorian expatriate sportspeople in Turkey
Expatriate footballers in Belgium
Ivorian expatriate sportspeople in Belgium